Blaen-y-Maes is a local authority maintained housing estate of the City and County Swansea, Wales.  It falls within the Penderry ward.

Districts of Swansea